Eudalt Serra was a Spanish composer of music.

Works
A la Verge Santíssima: Dues Lletretes a Una Veu (Sia Vostra Gran Puresa, Oració a Maria) (1908)
Nostra Seynora de la Mercè

References
, accessed 26 December 2015
, accessed 26 December 2015

20th-century composers
Spanish composers
Spanish male composers
Year of birth missing
Year of death missing
20th-century Spanish male musicians